The Palloseura Kemi Kings is a Finnish football team based in the town of Kemi, who are currently playing in the Kolmonen. The club have spent three seasons in the top flight in their history.

History
The club was established on October 21, 1999. Kemi Kings was created out of a merger between Kemin Palloseura (KePS), Kemin Pallotoverit-85 (KPT-85) and Visan Pallo. All three teams continue only as junior teams–having younger than B-juniors–while PS Kemi took over A and B juniors. The best achievement of PS Kemi Kings so far has been reaching eighth place in the Finnish Cup competition 2006. The team also played in Finnish Cup's small final, but lost it to Kultsu FC after the penalty shootout. In the 2007 season PS Kemi Kings won the Kakkonen's C-sector and were promoted to the second division, the Ykkönen. In the 2008 season PS Kemi Kings successfully fought against the relegation and also Qualified for the Top-16 in the Finnish Cup. In January 2011 the sport director Jukka Kuusisto signed a contract with finish TopSpot – Sports, Development and Technology – Sports Management with Social Responsibility and signed later his first two Nigerian players for his club the forward Patrick Chibuzor Onyeaghala from Nigerian Football Academy and the defender Faith Friday Obilor from FC Odiaba. PS Kemi won two successive promotions to the first division in 2014, the Ykkönen, and then, for the first time in their history, to the premier division, the Veikkausliiga in 2015.

The club ran into financial difficulties in the Veikkausliiga and the club's parent company ceased operations due to financial problems in February 2019. PS Kemi formed a new club, Kemi City FC, in early 2019 and continued its sports activities at the Palloseura Kemi Kings Association's Serie 3 in Northern Finland. In March, it was announced that English-based Redstrike Group had acquired a 40% holding in Kemi City FC. Kemi City FC ended the 19/20 Season champions of Finnish Football Division ‘Kolmonen' and gained automatic promotion to the Kakkonen for season 2020/21.

In February 2022, the club were taken over by a group led by Mark Ellis and reverted back to their original PS Kemi name.

Season to season

References

External links
 Official Website 

 
Football clubs in Finland
1999 establishments in Finland
Kemi
Association football clubs established in 1999